"Hem till Norden", also known as Julklockor över vår jord, is a song that has been a Svensktoppen hit in two different lyrics version.

As "Hem till Norden", with lyrics by Tommy Andersson and Kaj Svenling, it was recorded by Kikki Danielsson & Roosarna and released as a single in 1995, and acted as title track for the album "Hem till Norden" in 1996. This version was at Svensktoppen for eleven weeks during the period 3 February-13 April 1996, peaking at third place. These lyrics are about the nature of Scandinavia.

In 2009 the song was recorded by Hans Martin for the album Höstglöd.

As "Julklockor över vår jord", written by Tommy Andersson and Ann-Cathrine Wiklander, the song is a Christmas song that Ann-Cathrine Wiklander recorded for the Christmas EP record Min barndoms jular in 1995. This version entered  Svensktoppen, where it stayed for three weeks during the period 16 December 1995-6 January 1996, peaking at second place.

Ann-Cathrine Wiklander also rerecorded the song together with Erik Lihm in 2013.

Kikki Danielsson performed the song as "Julklockor över vår jord" live during her Christmas tour "Julstämning med Kikki" in 2006. It was also recorded by Scan Express for the Christmas album Julens nya godbitar.

References

1995 songs
Kikki Danielsson songs
Swedish-language songs